Leyla Felícita Chihuán Ramos (born September 4, 1975) is a Peruvian politician and former volleyball player of  Afro-Peruvian descent, who twice represented her native country at the Summer Olympics. In 2011, she entered politics, serving as a Congresswoman until the dissolution of Congress in September 2019.

Sports career
Chihuán played the 1996 Olympic Games and the 2000 Olympic Games ranking in both in 11th place; the 1998 World Championship, finishing in the ninth place, 2006 World Championship, ranking in 20th place. She ranked 11th in the 2007 FIVB World Cup and fifth in the 2009 Pan-American Cup. She was the captain of the Peruvian volleyball national team from 2005 to 2010.

Playing in Chiapas, Mexico with her National Senior Team, she won the Best Blocker award and the silver medal at the 2010 Final Four Cup.

Chihuán ranked in 15th place in the 2010 World Championship, and stated it would be her last tournament with her team and that she would step down as player and captain. After Peru's final match against China she told reporters in interviews that she did not leave because of some physical or age related issue but due to circumstances that she could not control.

She has played in several teams in Spain and Italy.

Clubs
  Winiary Kalisz (1997-1999)
  Rio Marsì Palermo (1999-2000)
  Mirabilandia Teodora Ravenna (2000-2001)
  CV Benidorm (2001-2007)
  Gran Canaria Hotel Cantur (2007-2008)
  Universidad de Burgos (2008-2009)
  CV Miranda (2009-2010)
  Regatas Lima (2009-2010)
  Universidad César Vallejo (2013-2014)

Awards

Individuals
 2009 South American Championship "Best Scorer"
 2009 South American Championship "Best Spiker"
 2010 Final Four Cup "Best Blocker"

National team
 2005 Bolivarian Games,  Gold Medal
 2007 South American Championship,  Silver Medal
 2009 South American Championship,  Bronze Medal
 2010 Women's Pan-American Volleyball Cup,  Silver Medal
 2010 Final Four Women's Volleyball Cup,  Silver Medal

Political career
In 2011, Leyla Chihuán was elected to the Congress of Peru on the list of the fujimorist Fuerza 2011 party, representing the city of Lima. She was one of four female ex-volleyball players serving in Congress for the 2011-2016 term. Chihuán was re-elected in the 2016 general election. Her current term expires in 2021.

Accomplishments
In Congress, Leyla Chihuán has served on numerous committees, including the Health and Population Committee, the Education, Youth, and Sports Committee, the Foreign Relations Committee, and the Justice and Human Rights Committee. Chihuán is the vicepresident of the Congressional Leadership Board, the Leadership Council, the Spokespersons' Board, and the Permanent Committee for the current parliamentary session (2018-2019).

She has been the author or co-author of over 100 pieces of legislation or parliamentary resolutions on subjects ranging from health and sports, commerce and industry, Congressional ethics, and the protection of women and minors.

Controversy
In 2018, Leyla Chihuán was associated with a political scandal referred to as "Chats La Botica". "La Botica" was the title of a cell phone chat group among congressmen from her political party, Fuerza Popular, the contents of which were leaked to Peruvian authorities. The leaked messages included chats, in which Chihuán took part, which featured discussion of shielding judge César Hinostroza Pariachi, who was facing charges for corruption. Nowadays in Peru when people wants to refer that they do not have money they say: "Estoy Bien Chihuan" the expression has become viral since her infamous comments when she said that the money earned working at the Congress was insufficient for her high living standard.

References

External links
 Leyla Chihuan at FIVB
 
 
 
 Leyla Felicita Chihuan Ramos at Legavolleyfemminile.it 

1975 births
Living people
Peruvian women's volleyball players
Peruvian expatriate sportspeople in Spain
Olympic volleyball players of Peru
Volleyball players at the 1996 Summer Olympics
Volleyball players at the 2000 Summer Olympics
Volleyball players at the 2007 Pan American Games
Peruvian people of Quechua descent
Sportspeople from Lima
Fujimorista politicians
Members of the Congress of the Republic of Peru
Expatriate volleyball players in Spain
Pan American Games competitors for Peru
Women members of the Congress of the Republic of Peru